The Air Creation Trek is a French ultralight trike, designed by Air Creation of Aubenas. The aircraft is supplied as a complete ready-to-fly-aircraft.

Design and development
The Trek features a cable-braced hang glider-style high-wing, weight-shift controls, a two-seats-in-tandem, open cockpit, tricycle landing gear with wheel pants and a single engine in pusher configuration.

The aircraft is made from bolted-together aluminum tubing, and is commonly fitted with the Air Creation Fun 450 wing, which has a single surface covered in Dacron sailcloth. The  span Fun wing is supported by a single tube-type kingpost and uses an "A" frame weight-shift control bar. The powerplant is a Japanese, twin cylinder, air-cooled, four-stroke, dual-ignition  HKS 700E engine. This engine choice provides similar reliability, smoothness and fuel economy to the Rotax 912, but at a much lower cost. With the HKS 700E engine the aircraft is designated as the Air Creation Trek 700E.

In addition to the Fun wing, the more high performance double surface Air Creation iXess wing can alternatively be fitted.

Specifications (Trek 700E)

References

External links

2000s French ultralight aircraft
Ultralight trikes
Trek